The 1992 James Hardie 12 Hour was an endurance race for production cars staged at the Mount Panorama Circuit, Bathurst, New South Wales, Australia on 19 April 1992. Cars competed in six classes:
 Class A - Cars Under 1600cc
 Class B - Cars 1601 to 2500cc
 Class C - Cars 2501 to 4000cc
 Class D - Cars Over 4000cc
 Class S - Sports Cars Under 2200cc
 Class T - Turbo & Four Wheel Drive

Allan Grice and Brad Jones raced a Holden VP SS Ute (26th) sponsored by Akubra hats. Grice did his qualifying lap with a model of a blue cattle dog in the back of the ute. He entered the car due its V8 power and relatively light weight, though the weight distribution was such that he struggled with the handling of the car.

Results

References

Further reading
Australian Motor Racing Year, 1992/93, pages 238-243 & 304

External links
Images of the winning Mazda RX-7 Retrieved from www.autopics.com.au on 9 December 2008

Motorsport in Bathurst, New South Wales
James Hardie 12 Hour
Bathurst